Rakendu Mouli Vennelakanti is an Indian lyricist, actor, singer, and dialogue writer who works in Telugu films. He is the son of Telugu lyricist Vennelakanti.

Career 
Mouli made his debut as an actor with Moodu Mukkallo Cheppalante (2015) in which he played the lead role. In 2016, he played Naga Chaitanya's friend in Sahasam Swasaga Sagipo. He played supporting roles in Kirrak Party, a Telugu remake of the Kannada film Kirik Party, and played one of the lead roles in My Dear Marthandam (2018). In 2019, he made his Tamil debut with Enai Noki Paayum Thota, where he played Dhanush's friend.

He made his Telugu debut as a lyricist with Andala Rakshasi and garnered acclaim for the song "Manasu Palike". He wrote the lyrics for four of the five songs in Meeku Maathrame Cheptha (2019).

Personal life 
His father, Vennelakanti, is a lyricist and his brother Shashank Vennelakanti is a dialogue writer.

Discography 
 Film songs
All films are in Telugu, unless otherwise noted.
(D) indicates dubbed version.

Independent songs

 Marvel Anthem (2019): Telugu version lyrics
Nene Lekunte (2020)

Filmography

Acting roles

Feature films 
All films are in Telugu, unless otherwise noted.

Television

Short films

Dialogue writer 
 As I'm Suffering from Prema (2017) (webseries): Telugu dubbed version
 What's up Panimanishi (2019) (webseries)
 Khaidi (2019):Telugu dubbed version
Aakaasam Nee Haddhu Ra (2020): Telugu dubbed version
Sulthan (2021):Telugu dubbed version
Senapathi (2021)

Awards and nominations

References

External links 

Living people
Telugu-language lyricists
Indian lyricists
Year of birth missing (living people)